Mohammad Golam Kibria (died 25 December 1974) was a Bangladesh Awami League politician and the former Member of Parliament of Kushtia-4. His son, Abul Hossain Tarun, was elected to Parliament from Kushtia-4.

Career
Kibria was a founding member of Awami League. He was elected to parliament from Kushtia-4 as a Bangladesh Awami League candidate in 1973.

References

Awami League politicians
1st Jatiya Sangsad members
Year of birth missing
1974 deaths
Pabna Edward College alumni